The following lists events that happened during 1875 in South Africa.

Incumbents
 Governor of the Cape of Good Hope and High Commissioner for Southern Africa: Henry Barkly.
 Lieutenant-governor of the Colony of Natal: Henry Ernest Gascoyne Bulwer.
 State President of the Orange Free State: Jan Brand.
 State President of the South African Republic: Thomas François Burgers.
 Lieutenant-Governor of Griqualand West: Richard Southey (until 3 August) William Owen Lanyon (until 3 August).
 Prime Minister of the Cape of Good Hope: John Charles Molteno.

Events
May
 John Garlick started his first store on 3 May 1875, on the corner Bree and Strand Streets, in the central business district of Cape Town. This would later become Garlicks, a nationwide chain of department stores.
August
 14 – The Genootskap van Regte Afrikaners (Association of True Afrikaners) is formed at the home of Gideon Malherbe in Paarl.

Unknown date
 The Black Flag Rebellion is staged by white diamond diggers at Kimberley.
 The Molteno Government begins construction of two Midland railway lines from Swartkops in Port Elizabeth and from Uitenhage.
 The Verlatenskloof pass in the Roggeveld Mountains, begun the previous year, is completed.

Births
 July 7 – Vincent Tancred, cricketer (d. 1904)

Deaths
 19 May - Christoffel Brand, politician, (b. 1797)

Railways

New lines
 Construction begins on the Swartkops-Alicedale line.

Railway lines opened
 11 May – Cape Western – Cape Town Docks to junction with mainline, .
 26 July – Cape Midland – Port Elizabeth to Addo, .
 22 September – Cape Midland – Swartkops to Uitenhage, .
 3 November – Cape Western – Wellington to Ceres Road, .

Locomotives

Three new  locomotive types enter service on the Cape Government Railways (CGR):
 The first eight of twenty-seven 2nd Class 2-6-2 tank-and-tender locomotives on all three newly established regional systems, the Eastern System from East London, the Midland System from Port Elizabeth and the Western System from Cape Town.
 Three 1st Class 0-4-0 saddle-tank locomotives on the Midland and Eastern Systems.
 The first seven of eleven 1st Class 4-4-0 tank locomotives on the Western and Midland systems.

References

 
South Africa
Years in South Africa